Cristóbal Suárez de Figueroa (1571 in Valladolid, Spain – after 1644) was a Spanish writer and jurist.

Sources 
 Cristobal Suarez de Figueroa,  HECHOS DE DON GARCÍA HURTADO DE MENDOZA, Imprenta Real, Madrid, 1616. Texto preparado por ENRIQUE SUÁREZ FIGAREDO

External links 
Vida y obras de Cristóbal Suárez de Figueroa por J. P. Wickersham Crawford
Edición crítica de La constante Amarilis de Suárez de Figueroa
Edición electrónica del Pusílipo o ratos de conversación en lo que dura el paseo
Edición electrónica de El pasajero
Edición electrónica de Varias noticias importantes a la humana comunicación

1571 births
1644 deaths
17th-century Spanish historians